Erik Pöysti (17 September 1849, Antrea – 8 March 1919) was a Finnish farmer, lay preacher and politician. He was a Member of the Diet of Finland from 1882 to 1891 and in 1897 and a Member of the Parliament of Finland from 1908 to 1909, representing the Finnish Party.

References

1849 births
1919 deaths
People from Kamennogorsk
People from Viipuri Province (Grand Duchy of Finland)
Finnish Party politicians
Members of the Diet of Finland
Members of the Parliament of Finland (1908–09)